Coleophora eteropennella is a moth of the family Coleophoridae. It is found on the islands of Hokkaido and Honshu in Japan.

Adults are variable in colour and are on wing from June to July.

The larvae feed on Ulmus japonica and possibly Betula platyphylla. They create larval cases which are variable in shape and colour depending on the host plant. Larvae can be found from May to early June.

References

eteropennella
Moths described in 1988
Moths of Japan